This is a list of the National Register of Historic Places listings in Dimmit County, Texas.

This is intended to be a complete list of properties and districts listed on the National Register of Historic Places in Dimmit County, Texas. There are one district and two individual properties listed on the National Register in the county. All sites are Recorded Texas Historic Landmarks, and one site is also a State Antiquities Landmark.

Current listings

The locations of National Register properties and districts may be seen in a mapping service provided.

|}

See also

National Register of Historic Places listings in Texas
Recorded Texas Historic Landmarks in Dimmit County

References

External links

Dimmit County, Texas
Dimmit County
Buildings and structures in Dimmit County, Texas